This is a list of awards and nominations received by British actress Rosamund Pike

Major awards and nominations

Academy Awards

British Academy of Film and Television Arts Awards

Emmy Awards (Primetime)

Golden Globe Awards

Screen Actors Guild Awards

Other awards and nominations

Austin Film Critics Association

Australian Academy of Cinema and Television Arts Awards

British Independent Film Awards

Chicago Film Critics Association

Critics' Choice Awards

Dallas-Fort Worth Film Critics Association

Denver Film Critics Society Awards

Detroit Film Critics Society

Empire Awards

Florida Film Critics Circle

Genie Awards

London Film Critics Circle

MTV Movie & TV Awards

Online Film Critics Society

San Diego Film Critics Society

Sant Jordi Awards

Satellite Awards

Saturn Awards

St. Louis Gateway Film Critics Association

Washington D.C. Area Film Critics Association

References

External links
 

Pike, Rosamund